Surrender Dorothy is a famous special effect in the 1939 film The Wizard of Oz.

Surrender Dorothy may also refer to:

 Surrender Dorothy (1998 film), a 1998 film directed by Kevin DiNovis
 Surrender, Dorothy (2006 film), a TV film directed by Charles McDougall and starring Diane Keaton and Chris Pine
 "Surrender Dorothy" (Law & Order), an episode of Law & Order
 Surrender Dorothy (album), an album by Alana Davis
 Sleeper (band), formerly Surrender Dorothy, a 1990s Britpop band
 Surrenderdorothy, an alternative Indie/R&B duo made up of rapper Bones and producer Greaf
Surrender, Dorothy, a 1998 novel by Meg Wolitzer